Iotrochota is a genus of sponges belonging to the family Iotrochotidae.

The species of this genus are found in tropical or subtropical regions.

Species:

Iotrochota acerata 
Iotrochota agglomerata 
Iotrochota arenosa 
Iotrochota birotulata

References

Poecilosclerida
Sponge genera